Bayjan (also Romanized as Bāyjān; also known as Bāygān and Beh Jān) is a village in Juyom Rural District, Juyom District, Larestan County, Fars Province, Iran. At the 2006 census, its population was 43, in 8 families.

References 

Populated places in Larestan County